The 1967 Sabah state election were held between 8 April to 23 April 1967, with nomination day on 8 March 1967. This was the first state election to take place, after Sabah independence from British and subsequently joining Malaysia in 1963.

Sabah Alliance which consists of United Sabah National Organisation (USNO) and Sabah Chinese Association (SCA), won 19 of the 32 seats and gained simple majority to form government. United Pasokmomogun Kadazan Organisation (UPKO), who are in the federal Alliance coalition with USNO and SCA but opposition at state level, won 12 seats, while 1 seat was won by an independent.

Results

Aftermath
Mustapha Harun, the leader of USNO & Sabah Alliance, were sworn in as Chief Minister on 11 May, along with his cabinet ministers from USNO and SCA. He replaces previous CM, SCA leader Peter Lo who lost in the election. This was the start of the 9-year rule of Sabah Alliance led by USNO's Mustapha in Sabah.

UPKO council led by Donald Stephens decided on December that year to dissolve the party, and the remaining UPKO assemblymen and members to join USNO. Stephens himself decided to retire from politics, until forming BERJAYA with several ex-USNO members in 1975.

References

Further reading
 

Sabah state elections
Sabah